The list of shipwrecks in 1996 includes ships sunk, foundered, grounded, or otherwise lost during 1996.

January

4 January

8 January

10 January

14 January

18 January

20 January

23 January

27 January

February

3 February

6 February

7 February

15 February

19 February

27 February

29 February

March

29 March

30 March

April

4 April

15 April

19 April

May

14 May

21 May

25 May

June

4 June

11 June

20 June

23 June

July

2 July

4 July

16 July

18 July

19 July

22 July

25 July

August

2 August

3 August

6 August

7 August

20 August

25 August

September

2 September

5 September

12 September

15 September

16 September

18 September

24 September

27 September

Unknown date

October

2 October

4 October

5 October

17 October

24 October

28 October

Unknown date

November

4 November

11 November

14 November

15 November

26 November

Unknown date

December

2 December

3 December

5 December

9 December

12 December

14 December

25 December

30 December

Unknown date

References

1996
 
Ship